The economy of Niue is heavily dependent upon aid from New Zealand. Government expenditures regularly exceed revenues, and grants from New Zealand make up the shortfall and are used to pay wages to public employees. Niue has cut government expenditures by reducing the public service by almost half.

Local economic activity 

The agricultural sector consists mainly of subsistence gardening, although some cash crops are grown for export. Industry consists primarily of small factories to process passion fruit, lime oil, honey, and coconut cream. The sale of postage stamps to foreign collectors has historically been an important source of revenue.

The island in recent years has suffered a serious loss of population because of migration of Niueans to New Zealand. Efforts to increase GDP include the promotion of tourism.  An initiative into the financial services industry was dropped under pressure from the US Treasury. More recently the sale of Internet domain names under the NU top level domain has brought in some income. These domains are particularly popular in Scandinavia, Belgium and the Netherlands, since nu means "now" in Dutch and the Scandinavian languages.

Economic statistics 

GDP: USD$24.938 million (2016)

GDP:
purchasing power parity – $10 million (2003),

GDP – real growth rate:
6.2% (2003 est.)

GDP – per capita:
nominal - USD$15,586 (2016)

purchasing power parity – $5,800 (2003),  $15,066 (2011)

GDP – composition by sector:
agriculture:
23% (2003) 
industry:
27% (2003) 
services:
50% (2003) 

Population below poverty line:
13%

Household income or consumption by percentage share:
lowest 10%:
NA%
highest 10%:
NA%

Inflation rate (consumer prices):
1% (1995)

Labor force:
450 (1992 est.) 663 (2001 est.)

Labor force – by occupation:
Most people work on family plantations; paid work exists only in government service, small industry, and on the Niue Development Board

Unemployment rate:
12% (2001) 

Budget:
revenues:
$15.07 million (FY 04-05)
$26 million (FY 18-19)expenditures:
$16.33 million

Industries:
tourism, handicrafts, food processing

Industrial production growth rate:
NA%

Electricity – production:
3 GWh (1998)

Electricity – production by source:
fossil fuel:
100%
hydro:
0% (2010)
nuclear:
0% (2010)
other:
0% (1998)

Electricity – consumption:
3 GWh (1998)

Electricity – exports:
0 kWh (1998)

Electricity – imports:
0 kWh (1998)

Agriculture – products:
coconuts, passion fruit, honey, limes, taro, yams, cassava (tapioca), sweet potatoes; pigs, poultry, beef cattle

Exports:
$3.52 million 2014, USD$1.391 million (2016)

Exports – commodities:
canned coconut cream, copra, honey, passion fruit products, pawpaws, root crops, limes, footballs, stamps, handicrafts

In 2014:
Iron Structures ($576k)
Refined petroleum ($456k)
Cement ($277k)
Fruit Juice ($224k)
Delivery Trucks ($143k)

Exports – partners:
New Zealand 89%, Fiji, Cook Islands, Australia.

In 2014:
Senegal 44% ($1.55M)
Czech Republic 12% ($413k)
New Zealand 10% ($334k)
Gambia 8% ($277k)
United States 5% ($169k)

Imports:
$9 million (2003), $19 million (2014), USD$14.95 million (2016), NZD$21.5 million (2018)

Imports – commodities:
food, live animals, manufactured goods, machinery, fuels, lubricants, chemicals, drugs

In 2014:  Special Purpose Ships ($5.48M), Refined Petroleum ($2.93M), Large Construction Vehicles ($403k), Prefabricated Buildings ($402k) and Cars ($312k).

Imports – partners:
New Zealand 59%, Fiji 20%, Japan 13%, Samoa, Australia, United States

In 2014:
New Zealand ($12.4M)
Japan ($5.58M)
Canada ($232k)
Fiji ($211k)
Australia ($147k)

Debt – external:
$NA

Economic aid – recipient:
$8.3 million (1995), $5.7 million (FY 08-09)

Currency:
1 New Zealand dollar (NZ$) = 100 cents

Exchange rates:
New Zealand dollars (NZ$) per US$1 – 1.9451 (January 2000), 1.8889 (1999), 1.8629 (1998), 1.5082 (1997), 1.4543 (1996), 1.5235 (1995)

Fiscal year:
1 April – 31 March

References

Further reading